Willow School may refer to:

 Willow Glen Elementary School (disambiguation)
 Willow Glen High School, public high school in the Willow Glen neighborhood of San Jose, California
 Willow Landing Elementary School, public school located in Barrie, Ontario, Canada